Philometra otolithi is a species of parasitic nematode of fishes, infecting the gonads of marine perciform fishes off the eastern Indian coast. It was first found in the tigertooth croaker, Otolithes ruber. It is distinguished from its cogenerates by the gubernaculum structure in males, as well as the shape and structure of the females' cephalic and caudal ends, and their oesophagus.

References

Further reading
Moravec, František, Maryam Khosheghbal, and Jamileh Pazooki. "Dichelyne (Dichelyne) spinigerus sp. nov.(Nematoda: Cucullanidae) from the marine fish Otolithes ruber (Sciaenidae) off Iran and first description of the male of Philometra otolithi Moravec et Manoharan, 2013 (Nematoda: Philometridae)."Acta Parasitologica 59.2 (2014): 229-237.
Moravec, František, and Atheer Hussain Ali. "Additional observations on Philometra spp.(Nematoda: Philometridae) in marine fishes off Iraq, with the description of two new species." Systematic parasitology 87.3 (2014): 259-271.

External links
WORMS

Camallanida
Parasitic nematodes of fish
Nematodes described in 2013